Gymnopilus fulvellus is a species of mushroom in the family Hymenogastraceae.

See also

List of Gymnopilus species

External links
Gymnopilus fulvellus at Index Fungorum

fulvellus
Taxa named by Charles Horton Peck